Candida Raymond (born 1950) is an Australian actress of film and television during the 1970s and early 1980s. She attended St Ives High School in Sydney.

Professional career 
As a teenager she played small guest roles in Australian television soap operas and TV series including Skippy (1969) and Riptide (1969). She also appeared in stage revues.

She attended NIDA in a class that included John Hargreaves, Wendy Hughes and Grigor Taylor.

In mid-1973, she played Jill Sheridan in Number 96 who was presented as a sex symbol in what was considered an adults only TV show, ultimately involving her in several, controversial, nude sequences,.  She then played a regular character in Class of '74.

In 1975, Raymond was a regular in a comic skit segment titled "The Checkout Chicks" which in turn was part of The Norman Gunston Show (1975).
 
As both actress and storyline writer, she played a Jewish escapee of Europe in the WWII based TV series The Sullivans (1976).

She also appeared in a number of feature films, including Alvin Rides Again (1974), the attractive artist Kerry in Don's Party (1976), A Viennese school teacher in The Getting of Wisdom (1977), Money Movers (1978), The Journalist (1979), Freedom (1982) and Monkey Grip (1982).

In 1977 she appeared in a talk show about astrology The Zodiac Girls. 

She was also in stage productions of The Rocky Horror Show and Play It Again, Sam. 

In 1981, she played imprisoned journalist, Sandra Hamilton, in the TV series Prisoner. That year she said she hoped to write and produce a feature.

1985 was a busy year.  Over several months, Ms Raymond was involved in filming two television mini-series simultaneously in two different cities - In Sydney, she filmed Shout! The Story of Johnny O'Keefe (1985), and in Melbourne, she was involved in The Great Bookie Robbery (1986). 

In the same year, she also starred in the ABC telefilm Breaking Up, playing a 30-something mother-of-two going through a marriage break-up. For this role, she later won an Australian Film Institute Award as best Actress in a tele-movie or mini-series.

Through the 1980s and 1990s, Ms Raymond was active as a voice artist for radio and television and occasionally appeared in dramatized educational films.

Later career
Her last feature film role was as a French / Vietnamese brothel Madam in the action film A Case of Honor (1991), which was filmed on location in the Philippines.

She appears as herself in the feature documentary Not Quite Hollywood: The Wild, Untold Story of Ozploitation! (2008), where she interviewed about women in Australian films of the 1970s.

Personal life 
Raymond presently lives near Bowral, Australia. She is the sister of actress Victoria Raymond also of Number 96 fame as the second actress to play Bev Houghton after Abigail left the role. Raymond is active in animal rights, writing and occasionally participating in local theatre and music events.

Filmography

Film

Television

Theatre
Killara 360 Revue (1967)
A Midsummer Night's Dream (1970) - Old Tote
Blood Wedding (1970) - Old Tote
Foursome (1975) - Seymour
The Rocky Horror Show (1978)
Sexual Perversity in Chicago (1980) - Nimrod

References

External links
 
 
 

1950 births
Living people
AACTA Award winners
Australian film actresses
Australian television actresses